Rómulo García (1927 – December 18, 2005) was Roman Catholic Archbishop Emeritus of the Archdiocese of Bahía Blanca (Archidioecese Sinus Albis), Argentina. His title, in Latin, at the moment of his death was Romulus, Archiepiscopus Emeritus Sinus Albinensis. His highest position was Archbishop from 1991 to 2002. His style, as the one of any Archbishop or Bishop in Argentina is "His Very Reverend Excellency". Address style for them is Monsignor. He was born in Buenos Aires on March 24, 1927. Ordained as priest on December 10, 1950, he was appointed as Bishop of Uzita and Auxiliary Bishop of the Diocese of Mar del Plata, - suffragan of the Archdiocese of La Plata - on August 9, 1975. He became Bishop of Mar del Plata on January 19, 1976.

Pope John Paul II appointed him Archbishop of Bahía Blanca on May 31, 1991 taking over on a formal Mass on September 24, 1991. The chosen motto for his coat of arms was "Totus tuus" ("completely yours", addressing The Lord). His predecessor was Archbishop Jorge Mayer. He was reputed for his speeches, lectures, serene and reflective character. He was also appointed as a member of the Catholic Commission for homeless and refugees, in the Vatican whom her served until retirement. 
As it is of common use in the Catholic Church and ruled by Pope John Paul II, he resigned to his Pastoral Duty on June 15, 2002 when he turned  80 years of age, becoming then Archbishop Emeritus, after which he decided to continue living in Bahía Blanca, in a private home of his own. His successor is the present Archbishop of Bahía Blanca HVRE Monsignor Guillermo José Garlatti.
 
Monsignor Rómulo García died in Bahía Blanca on December 18, 2005.

References
 Catholic-Hierarchy — Statistics on the Archdiocese of Bahía Blanca.
  Biografía de Monseñor Rómulo García
  Trasladan los restos de Mons. Rómulo García

1927 births
2005 deaths
20th-century Roman Catholic archbishops in Argentina
21st-century Roman Catholic archbishops in Argentina
Place of birth missing
Roman Catholic archbishops of Bahía Blanca
Roman Catholic bishops of Mar del Plata